Darko Krsteski (born 9 August 1971) is a retired Macedonian football defender.

Club career 
He started his career in his hometown Pobeda Prilep where he played four seasons before moving to Serbia to the ex-European champions FK Crvena Zvezda. After two seasons in Belgrade, he played in two more First League of FR Yugoslavia clubs, FK Sutjeska from Nikšić in Montenegro, where he played almost six seasons, and FK Borac Čačak from Central Serbia. Before returning to his hometown club, he had a short spelt with the Jordanian club Al-Faisaly (Amman) and he played one season in Malta in Floriana F.C.

International career
He made his senior debut for Macedonia in a July 2000 friendly match against Azerbaijan and has earned a total of 2 caps, scoring no goals. His second and final international was a March 2001 FIFA World Cup qualification match against Turkey.

Honours 
 Red Star Belgrade
1 time FR Yugoslavia Cup winner: 1999

References

External sources 
 
 Profile at Srbijafudbal.

1971 births
Living people
Sportspeople from Prilep
Association football defenders
Macedonian footballers
North Macedonia international footballers
FK Pobeda players
Red Star Belgrade footballers
FK Sutjeska Nikšić players
FK Borac Čačak players
Al-Faisaly SC players
Floriana F.C. players
Macedonian First Football League players
First League of Serbia and Montenegro players
Serbian SuperLiga players
Maltese Premier League players
Macedonian expatriate footballers
Expatriate footballers in Serbia
Macedonian expatriate sportspeople in Serbia
Expatriate footballers in Serbia and Montenegro
Macedonian expatriate sportspeople in Serbia and Montenegro
Expatriate footballers in Jordan
Expatriate footballers in Malta
Macedonian expatriate sportspeople in Malta
Macedonian football managers
FK Pobeda managers
GFK Tikvesh managers
FK Pelister managers